Mariana Carlota de Verna Magalhães Coutinho, Countess of Belmonte (5 February 1779 – 17 October 1855), was a Portuguese-born Brazilian court official. She was the main chamberlain during the reign of emperor Pedro I of Brazil, and acted as a governess and second mother to the emperor's son, Pedro II, who had great affection for her and allowed her to have influence in the court. She was given the title of Countess of Belmonte. 

Verna was appointed royal governess when the heir to the throne was born in 1825. When Emperor Pedro I abdicated the throne and left Brazil for Portugal in 1831, he appointed her to take care of his children, including the heir to the throne, Emperor Pedro II. After Pedro II married, she was appointed the main lady-in-waiting to empress Teresa Cristina. In 1847, she became godmother to Princess Leopoldina.

References 

1779 births
1855 deaths
Ladies-in-waiting
Brazilian courtiers
Brazilian nobility
19th-century Brazilian women
19th-century Brazilian people
Royal governesses